A Glasgow smile (also known as a Chelsea smile, or a Glasgow, Smiley, Huyton, A buck 50 or Cheshire grin) is a wound caused by making a cut from the corners of a victim's mouth up to the ears, leaving a scar in the shape of a smile.

The act is usually performed with a utility knife or a piece of broken glass, leaving a scar which causes the victim to appear to be smiling broadly.

The practice is said to have originated in Glasgow, Scotland, in the 1920s and 30s.

See also 

 Colombian necktie
 Dueling scar
 Glasgow kiss/Glaswegian kiss
 Glasgow razor gangs
 Kuchisake-onna ("Slit-Mouthed Woman")
 Slashing (crime)

References 

Gangs
Gangs in the United Kingdom
History of Glasgow
Youth culture in the United Kingdom
Torture
Skin conditions resulting from physical factors
Scarring